BR-393, a.k.a. Rodovia Lúcio Meira is a federal highway that begins in Cachoeiro de Itapemirim, Espírito Santo and ends in Barra Mansa, Rio de Janeiro. The highway also serves the municipalities of Itaperuna, Três Rios, and Volta Redonda in Rio de Janeiro.

References

Federal highways in Brazil